Slaviša Dugić (Serbian Cyrillic: Славиша Дугић; born 17 January 1985) is a Swiss professional football player of Bosnian Serb descent.

Background
He had played for Swiss teams SC Kriens, FC Servette, FC Aarau, Italian Catania Calcio, Yverdon-Sport FC, FC Wohlen, SC Buochs, Bosnian FK Modriča and Aris Limassol F.C., Ethnikos Achna FC and Othellos Athienou F.C. from Cyprus. He is a former youth international and was in the Swiss U-17 squad that won the 2002 U-17 European Championships.

Honours
Switzerland
 UEFA U-17 European Champion (1): 2002
FK Modriča Maxima
Premier League of Bosnia and Herzegovina (1): 2007–08
Aris Limassol
Cypriot Second Division Topscorer: 2008–09

External sources
 
 Modriča players profiles at Modriča official site.

References

Living people
1985 births
Bosnia and Herzegovina emigrants to Switzerland
People from Gradačac
Swiss people of Serbian descent
Serbs of Bosnia and Herzegovina
Swiss men's footballers
Swiss expatriate footballers
Association football forwards
SC Kriens players
Servette FC players
FC Aarau players
Yverdon-Sport FC players
FC Wohlen players
Catania S.S.D. players
Expatriate footballers in Italy
FK Modriča players
Aris Limassol FC players
Ethnikos Achna FC players
Othellos Athienou F.C. players
FK Borac Banja Luka players
Expatriate footballers in Cyprus
Cypriot First Division players
Cypriot Second Division players
Switzerland youth international footballers
Swiss expatriate sportspeople in Italy
Swiss expatriate sportspeople in Cyprus